Augustoceras is a genus of nautiloid cephalopods included in the order Oncocerida and family Valcouroceratidae. It is known form the Middle and Upper Ordovician of Kentucky and Ohio in the US.

Shells of Augustocers are slender, upwardly curved, fusiform, exogastric cyrtocones with subtriangular cross-sections, short chambers, oblique sutures, and subventral siphuncles with simple internal radial actinosiphonate deposits. Kindleoceras from the Upper Ordovician of Ontario differs in having a more triangular cross-section and more numerous actinosiphonate rays in its siphuncle.

References

Walter C Sweet, 1964  Nautiloidea-Oncocerida.  Treatise on Invertebrate Paleontology Part K Mollusca 3. Geological Society of America and University of Kansas Press

Oncocerida
Prehistoric nautiloid genera
Middle Ordovician first appearances
Late Ordovician extinctions
Fossils of Georgia (U.S. state)